Shaab Jereh Rural District is a rural district (dehestan) in Toghrol Al Jerd District, Kuhbanan County, Kerman Province, Iran. At the 2006 census, its population was 2,227, in 589 families. The rural district has 9 villages.

References 

Rural Districts of Kerman Province
Kuhbanan County